General Lance W. Lord (born July 12, 1946) is a retired four-star general in the United States Air Force who served as Commander of Air Force Space Command at Peterson Air Force Base in Colorado.

Military career
Lord was educated at Castle Heights Military Academy and Otterbein College, where he earned a bachelor's degree and graduated from the ROTC program. He later earned a master's degree from the University of North Dakota. After entering the Air Force in 1969, he served four years of Minuteman II ICBM alert duty and then completed a series of Air Staff and joint duty assignments in strategic missiles. He directed the Ground-Launched Cruise Missile Program Management Office in Europe. He was a Military Assistant to the Director of Net Assessment in the Office of the Secretary of Defense and represented the Air Force as a research associate in international security affairs at Ohio State University.

Lord commanded two ICBM wings in Wyoming and North Dakota. In California he commanded a space wing responsible for satellite launch and ballistic missile test launch operations. He served as Director of Plans and as Vice Commander for Headquarters Air Force Space Command. The general led Air Force education and training as Commandant of Squadron Officer School, Commander of Second Air Force, Commander of Air University and Director of Education for Air Education and Training Command. Prior to assuming command of Space Command, he was the Assistant Vice Chief of Staff of the Air Force. He retired on April 1, 2006.

In 2004 while serving as Air Force Space Command Commander, Lord announced the introduction of a new space badge. The new combined Space and Missile Operations Badge, informally known as "spings" (SPace wINGS), "Space Boomerang", or "Space Blade" replaced the Missile Badge for operators. In addition, the new badge is no longer limited to pure space and missile operators/maintainers, but is also awarded to 61XX, 62XX and 63XX (officer) AFSCs who have performed space/ICBM acquisition duties, even if they were non-operational in nature.

Assignments
January 1969 – February 1969, student, ICBM operational readiness training, Chanute AFB, Illinois
February 1969 – May 1969, student, combat crew missile training, Vandenberg AFB, California
May 1969 – June 1973, Minuteman II combat crewmember, 321st Strategic Missile Wing, Grand Forks AFB, North Dakota
June 1973 – September 1975, Minuteman II evaluation member, 3901st Strategic Missile Evaluation Squadron, Vandenberg AFB, California
September 1975 – August 1976, missile operations staff officer, Air Staff Training Program, Directorate of Operations, Headquarters U.S. Air Force, Washington, D.C.
August 1976 – July 1978, missile operations staff officer, Strategic Division, Directorate of Operations and Readiness, Headquarters U.S. Air Force, Washington, D.C.
July 1978 – July 1979, student, Air Command and Staff College, Maxwell AFB, Alabama
July 1979 – July 1982, military assistant to the Director for Net Assessment, Office of the Secretary of Defense, Washington, D.C.
July 1982 – July 1983, Air Force research associate, Program of International Security and Military Affairs, Ohio State University, Columbus
July 1983 – August 1984, Commander, 10th Strategic Missile Squadron, Malmstrom AFB, Montana
August 1984 – June 1985, Deputy Commander, 341st Combat Support Group, Malmstrom AFB, Montana
July 1985 – July 1987, Director, Ground-Launched Cruise Missile Program Management Office, Deputy Chief of Staff for Plans and Programs, Headquarters U.S. Air Forces in Europe, Ramstein Air Base, West Germany
July 1987 – June 1988, student, Air War College, Maxwell AFB, Alabama
June 1988 – February 1989, Vice Commander, 351st Strategic Missile Wing, Whiteman AFB, Missouri
February 1989 – May 1990, Commander, 321st Strategic Missile Wing, Grand Forks AFB, North Dakota
June 1990 – August 1992, Commandant, Squadron Officer School, Maxwell AFB, Alabama
August 1992 – August 1993, Commander, 90th Missile Wing, Francis E. Warren AFB, Wyoming
August 1993 – August 1995, Commander, 30th Space Wing and Western Range, Vandenberg Air Force Base, California
August 1995 – August 1996, Director of Plans, Headquarters Air Force Space Command, Peterson AFB, Colorado
August 1996 – August 1997, Commander, 2nd Air Force, Keesler AFB, Mississippi
August 1997 – June 1999, Vice Commander, Headquarters Air Force Space Command, Peterson AFB, Colorado
June 1999 – May 2001, Commander, Air University, Maxwell AFB, Alabama
May 2001 – April 2002, Assistant Vice Chief of Staff, Headquarters U.S. Air Force, Washington, D.C.
April 2002 – April 2006, Commander, Air Force Space Command, Peterson AFB, Colorado

Awards and decorations

Other achievements
1988 Secretary of the Air Force Leadership Award, Air War College, Maxwell AFB, Alabama
1999 Gen. Thomas D. White Space Trophy, Air Force Association
2003 Gen. Bernard A. Schriever Fellow Award, Air Force Association, Northern Utah Chapter
2003 Distinguished Achievement Award, Air Force Association, Tennessee Ernie Ford Chapter
2004 Gen. James V. Hartinger Award, National Defense Industrial Association, Rocky Mountain Chapter
2004 Gen. Jimmy Doolittle Fellow Award, Air Force Association, Iron Gate Chapter
2004 Gen. Bernard A. Schriever Award, Air Force Association, Los Angeles Chapter
2005 Space Champion Award, National Defense Industrial Association
2006 Order of the Sword, Air Force Space Command

Effective dates of promotion
Second Lieutenant December 4, 1968
First Lieutenant July 28, 1970
Captain January 28, 1972
Major September 1, 1978
Lieutenant Colonel December 1, 1982
Colonel December 1, 1985
Brigadier General September 1, 1992
Major General March 14, 1996
Lieutenant General September 1, 1997
General April 19, 2002

References

Living people
Otterbein University alumni
Recipients of the Air Force Distinguished Service Medal
Recipients of the Legion of Merit
United States Air Force generals
University of North Dakota alumni
1946 births
Recipients of the Order of the Sword (United States)